Willis M. Tate (1912–1989) served as the president of Southern Methodist University from 1954 to 1971 and again from July 1974 to October 1975.

Biography
Willis M. Tate was born in Denver, Colorado. He received a B.A. and an M.A. from Southern Methodist University. He worked as a school principal in San Antonio, Texas, and returned to Southern Methodist to work as Assistant Dean of Students in 1945 and Professor of sociology. He served as its president from 1954 to 1975, with a one-year hiatus in 1974. He died of a heart attack in Colorado in 1989.

He served as chairman of the Independent College Funds of America and president of the National Association of Schools and Colleges of the Methodist Church. He was also a member of the Lambda Chi Alpha fraternity and Cycen Fjodr. In 1965, he received the Alexander Meiklejohn Award of the American Association of University Professors for support of academic freedom.

References

1912 births
1989 deaths
People from Denver
People from Dallas
Southern Methodist University alumni
Presidents of Southern Methodist University
20th-century American academics